LentSpace is a temporary outdoor art space and sculpture garden located in Hudson Square, Lower Manhattan, New York City. The space, which opened in September 2009, is bounded by Varick Street to the west, Canal Street and Albert Capsouto Park to the south, Grand Street to the north, and Sullivan Street and Duarte Square to the east.

History
The block occupied by LentSpace is part of a parcel of land granted to Trinity Church by Queen Anne in 1705. In the years prior to the park's opening in 2009, the church's development company demolished a number of buildings previously located on the site.

The land is owned by Trinity Church and is slated for eventual development. The church negotiated a deal with the Lower Manhattan Cultural Council (LMCC) to use the idle space for a period of about three years.

LMCC raised about $1 million to transform the empty lot into a space to promote art in the neighborhood. Interboro Partners of Brooklyn designed the landscape, incorporating inexpensive materials such as gravel and plywood, reflecting the temporary nature of the space. The park is surrounded by a fence, the eastern edge of which is decorated with small, reflective aluminum disks. The interior features planters, benches and straight paths.

The inaugural show in the space was entitled "Points and Lines" and featured seven installations by Graham Hudson, Eli Hansen and Oscar Tuazon, Ryan Tabor, Tobias Putrih, Olga Chernysheva, Corban Walker and Oliver Babin. The pieces all referenced civic design and construction techniques, using materials such as flagpoles, ladders, concrete and steel.

Since then, the space has been used for a variety of different purposes. In 2010 LentSpace was featured in an episode of Bravo's reality TV show, Work of Art: The Next Great Artist. In the summer of 2012 the space became home to a rotating lineup of food trucks, accompanied by musical performances throughout the week.

In late 2011, protesters from the Occupy movement briefly occupied the space after being evicted from Zuccotti Park. Trinity Church had denied permission for the protestors to use the space. On December 17, some protesters scaled the fences which surround the park while others squeezed beneath the fences. New York City Police Department officers arrested a number of protesters, including retired Episcopal Bishop George Elden Packard.

References

External links
LMCC's LentSpace in Hudson Square
LentSpace slideshow at the New York Times

Squares in Manhattan
Sculpture gardens, trails and parks in New York (state)
Public art in New York City
Tribeca
West Village
Privately owned public spaces
Hudson Square